Early parliamentary elections were held in Kiribati on 12 January 1983, with a second round on 19 January. All candidates for the 36 seats ran as independents. Voter turnout was 79.9%.

Background
After the government or Ieremia Tabai was defeated 20–15 on a bill on equalising civil servants' salaries on 9 December 1982, Tabai brought back the same bill the following day, including a vote of confidence. After the government lost again, early elections were called.

Results
Ten incumbent MPs lost their seats, including Minister for Health Ataraoti Bwebwenibure and Minister for the Line and Phoenix Group Ieremia Tata.

Aftermath
In the February presidential election, Tabai was re-elected president. Matita Taniera was re-elected Speaker and Teato Teannaki was appointed Vice President.

References

Kiribati
1983 in Kiribati
Elections in Kiribati
Non-partisan elections